Calasparra Fútbol Club was a Spanish football team based in Calasparra in the Region of Murcia. Founded in 1991 and dissolved in 2011, it held home matches at Estadio La Caverina, which had a capacity for 3,000 people.

History
Calasparra first reached the fourth division in 2001, finishing in 15th position in its first season. Just before the start of the 2011–12 campaign, after one full decade in the category, the club dissolved due to economic problems.

Season to season

10 seasons in Tercera División

Stadium

Club data
Address: Avenida Primero de Mayo 17, 30420 Calasparra (Murcia)
Phone: 968 72 12 40
Website: unknown
E-mail: unknown

References

External links
Futbolme team profile 
Club history 

Association football clubs established in 1991
Association football clubs disestablished in 2011
Defunct football clubs in the Region of Murcia
1991 establishments in Spain
2011 disestablishments in Spain